1325 Inanda, provisional designation , is a stony background asteroid from the central regions of the asteroid belt, approximately 11 kilometers in diameter. It was discovered on 14 July 1934, by South African astronomer Cyril Jackson at the Union Observatory in Johannesburg. The asteroid was named after the township of Inanda in South Africa.

Orbit and classification 

Inanda is a non-family asteroid of the main belt's background population. It orbits the Sun in the central main-belt at a distance of 1.9–3.2 AU once every 4 years and 1 month (1,479 days; semi-major axis of 2.54 AU). Its orbit has an eccentricity of 0.26 and an inclination of 7° with respect to the ecliptic.

The body's observation arc begins with its official discovery observation in July 1934.

Physical characteristics 

Inanda has been characterized as a stony, common S-type asteroid by Pan-STARRS photometric survey.

Rotation period 

In November 2007, a rotational lightcurve of Inanda was obtained from photometric observations by American astronomer Brian Warner at his Palmer Divide Observatory in Colorado. Lightcurve analysis gave an ambiguous rotation period of 20.52 hours with an alternative period solution of 35.83 hours and a brightness amplitude of 0.12 magnitude. The results supersede previous observations that gave a fragmentary lightcurve with a period of 24 and 141.6 hours respectively.

Diameter and albedo 

According to the surveys carried out by the Infrared Astronomical Satellite IRAS, the Japanese Akari satellite and the NEOWISE mission of NASA's Wide-field Infrared Survey Explorer, Inanda measures between 9.97 and 12.34 kilometers in diameter and its surface has an albedo between 0.20 and 0.3756.

The Collaborative Asteroid Lightcurve Link adopts the results obtained by IRAS, that is, an albedo of 0.3756 and a diameter of 10.87 kilometers based on an absolute magnitude of 11.5.

Occultation 

On 12 November 2007, an occultation suggested that Inanda could be a binary asteroid. However, the asteroid's suspected binary nature has not been mentioned in other studies since then.

Naming 

This minor planet was named after the South African, Zulu-speaking Township of Inanda, KwaZulu-Natal. The official naming citation was mentioned in The Names of the Minor Planets by Paul Herget in 1955.

Notes

References

External links 
 Asteroid Lightcurve Database (LCDB), query form (info )
 Dictionary of Minor Planet Names, Google books
 Asteroids and comets rotation curves, CdR – Observatoire de Genève, Raoul Behrend
 Discovery Circumstances: Numbered Minor Planets (1)-(5000) – Minor Planet Center
 
 

001325
Discoveries by Cyril Jackson (astronomer)
Named minor planets
19340714